Glen Cummings is an American thrash metal guitarist best known for his guitar work in Ludichrist and Scatterbrain.

Horror Planet 
In 1984 Glen joined local psychedelic-punk ensemble Horror Planet. The group featured Paul Quigley (Party Frank), vocals, congas and maracas; Rick Bruccoleri (Hambone Legbone), bass and kazoo; Dave (Funk Ma Da Goonk El Paso Fungalscreen Xtra-Cheese Eggs on a Platter), Drums; Tony Arena (Weasle Worm Crumb Boy) backing vocals, tenor kazoo, and tambourine; and Glen Cummings (Swami Swami Swami), guitar. The group's influences varied from early psychedelic/acid rock, to bubblegum pop, to novelty albums, to proto-punk acts like the Cramps.

Horror Planet created two releases: "Otis The Frogman", a collection of songs and outtakes on a hand-painted cassette tape and the "Cow Pies from Outer Space", a six-song e.p. on a clear vinyl record with hand-painted covers.

Mike Bullshit of Bullshit Monthly wrote: "I can't describe this record. Every song on the e.p. has something special about it... Bits of hardcore, psychedelia, punk and kazoo mixed in together to achieve god-like potential. They are a complete venture into the completely improbable where anything can happen, and it does..."

Tim Yohannan of Maximumrocknroll wrote "Expand your Mind and Shorten your Life" is one of the six songs, and that typifies the "zany" outlook expressed by this combo. Musically they play a grungy, noisy, but tight garage metal-tinged thrash. Unique."

Ludichrist

Demos 
After multiple rehearsals and performances recorded its second effort: "Ludichrist– The Demo" featuring new arrangements of the songs featured on the 1985 demo plus two new songs "Games Once Played" and "Young, White and Well Behaved".

Christ and Cummings worked together to create the cassette cover, a bumper sticker, and a 16-page illustrated booklet and a half-page ad for Maximum Rock-n-Roll announcing the release. The Ludichrist graphics: a logotype with ransom note letters, and a logo, featuring a found illustration of "Jesus with praying hands" with drawn-on spiky hairdo (ala Johnny Rotten) and fingerless gloves and dog-collar wristband (ala Billy Idol), were created by Christ.

In the October 1985 Maximumrocknroll contributing writer Pushead (aka Brian Schroeder) wrote: "Wild, chaotic, intense and full of different variations, Ludichrist charge outward with a superb sonic flailing."

The group performed regionally gaining a following in Connecticut and New York City. The group recorded a new version of "God Is Everywhere" for Phanthom Record's "A Method to Their Madness" compilation album.

Immaculate Deception 
Ludichrist's 1986 release "Immaculate Deception" features Cummings paired with guitarist Joe Butcher, and was recorded at Platinum Island Sounds in Manhattan with Randy Burns producing. The album featured 19 tracks, 12 of them rearranged versions which had appeared on other releases, and 7 of them appearing for the first time: "Fire at The Firehouse" which begins with a riff inspired by Black Sabbath's "Fairies Wear Boots" and tales a moral fable of a racist who magically wakes up with the tables turned, "Games Once Played" which features a guitar and bass duet written by Chuck Valle and the first of Christ's poetic lyrics, "Green Eggs and Ham" a song with lyrics cribbed directly from Dr. Seuss's Green Eggs and Ham, and music lifted wholesale from Rapid Deployment's "No Edge". The song also featured a rap section written by the group's unofficial sixth member Jeff Hubner (aka LL. Cool Jeff) but performed on the album by bassist Chuck Valle. You Can't Have Fun (A lyrical tribute to Glen's mother who at some point had scolded Tommy saying "life was not meant to be fun". The track features guest performances by Roger Miret of Agnostic Front, John Connelly of Nuclear Assault, Eddie Sutton of Leeway (band), and Chris Notaro of the Crumbsuckers. "Legal Murder" a pisstake which alternates between melodic swing and DRI-esque thrash, "Thinking of You" penned by Joe Butcher, inspired by doom rockers Trouble post-Sabbath heaviness, "Last Train to Clarksville" a thrashy but earnest cover of Boyce and Hart's pop hit written for the made-for -TV-band, The Monkees.

People magazine said "Though the ferocious guitar riffs on Immaculate Deception start to sound strangely appealing after a few listens, this record isn't for everybody"

Scatterbrain

Reception 

The album was heralded in the music press as an eclectic amalgam of musical styles, for the group's tight musicianship and production, and for the humorous lyrics.

Music critic Mike Gitter writes: “...the musical brilliance Scatterbrain yield, neath girded loins, sets them light years apart from the competition. Ask guitar god Joe Satriani, who reportedly swore up and down that Neider/Cummings tag team churned forth some of the finest finger work he's heard in a dog's age."

In a feature in "Faces" magazine's October 1990 issue staff writer Lee Sherman writes: "Scatterbrain's musical eclecticism is more than merely gratuitous buffoonery… they have the musical know-how to pull it off." and "Scatterbrain isn't the first band to make screwball behavior an indispensable part of its persona but they may be the first one where the playing is the only thing that isn't a joke".

Music videos 

Filmmaker George Seminara created two music videos for the group which portrayed songs as short stories: "Don't Call Me Dude":
a jilted lover who goes berserk when he's called Dude and "Down with The Ship": After being shunned by their record company a band sneaks in and auditions to appear in their own music video.

Host of MTV's Headbanger's Ball, Riki Rachtman the videos and band and can be credited for single-handedly popularizing the group on MTV. On his birthday episode, 16 June 1990, Rachtman held a live interview the band and on 8 February 1992, he hosted Headbanger's Ball live from a Scatterbrain concert at The Scrap Bar. In interviews Rachtman still lists "Don't Call Me Dude" at #5 on his ideal playlist.

Australia 

"Don't Call Me Dude" spent 15 weeks on Australia's national ARIA Charts (Australian Recording Industry Association) peaking at #14 for three non-consecutive weeks in January and February 1991.

Music journalist Ian McFarland explains "Its not hard to figure out how a cult metal outfit from the U.S. can become stars virtually overnight here in Australia [...] the likes of ABC TV's late night video show Rage ad JJJ FM regularly aired the track last year, which set a groundswell in motion that led to more commercial FM stations like MMM adding it to their playlists."

Scatterbrain performed a month-long series of dates in Australia promoted by TripleJ and Virgin Australia. To promote the tour a video for "Sonata #9" was produced in which an Alistair Cook-like TV host cries after mistakenly presenting the group's take on Mozart's "Sonata 3".

Stone Deep 
In 1992, Cummings provided lead guitar on two tracks on, as well as co-produced, Mucky Pup's fifth studio album Lemonade which was released in 1993. Cummings then toured Europe with the band twice as a part-time member. Some of these performances can be heard on Mucky Pup's 1994 live album,  Alive & Well. In 1993, Cummings relocated to Nashville, Tennessee where he founded the rap/rock act Stone Deep together with Ronzo Cartwright (vocals), Terry Hayes (vocals and turntable), Kelly Butler (Bass) and Kenny Owens (Drums). Cartwright, Hayes, Butler and Owens were previously members of The Hard Corps whose hit album "Def Before Dishonor"(Atlantic Records, 1991) was produced by Run DMC's Jam Master Jay. The Hard Corps had been the opening act for Ice-T on his "Cop Killer Tour".

Stone Deep recorded and released six albums: "Stone Deep" cassette 1993, "Gangs and The Government/Mr. Sunray" single 1995; "Kung Fu Grip" cassette 1996; "Stone Deep" CD 1997, "Hump n Hum" CD 1999, "Engage" CD 2000.

Stone Deep was featured or profiled in NY Daily News,
USA Today, The Tennessean,
The Nashville Banner,
The Nashville Scene,
Music Row, and Ripple.

Being lauded 1996 with its second Nashville Music Award for "Best Independent Act" and being voted Best Unsigned Act in the United States by the NARAS (The National Academy of Recording Arts and Sciences)/The National Grammy Award Showcase.

References 

American heavy metal guitarists
Living people
American male guitarists
Year of birth missing (living people)